Two battles are known as the Battle of Preston:

The Battle of Preston (1648) was a victory for Oliver Cromwell over the Royalists during the English Civil War.
The Battle of Preston (1715) was a defeat for the rebels in the Jacobite Rising.

May also refer to:

The Battle of Prestonpans 1745, a victory for the Jacobites over the British government in 1745.